Cham Bur-e Farkhinvand (also Romanized as Cham Būr-e Farkhīnvand; also known as Cham Būr and Chambūr) is a village in Ghaleh Rural District, Zagros District, Chardavol County, Ilam Province, Iran. At the 2006 census, its population was 252, in 53 families. The village is populated by Kurds.

References 

Populated places in Chardavol County
Kurdish settlements in Ilam Province